A diocesan bishop, within various Christian traditions, is a bishop or archbishop in pastoral charge of a diocese or archdiocese. In relation to other bishops, a diocesan bishop may be a suffragan, a metropolitan (if an archbishop) or a primate. They may also hold various other positions such as being a cardinal or patriarch.

Titular bishops in the Roman Catholic Church may be assistant bishops with special faculties, coadjutor bishops (these bishops are now named as coadjutors of the dioceses they will lead, and not as titular bishops), auxiliary bishops, nuncios or similar papal diplomats (usually archbishops), officials of the Roman Curia (usually for bishops as heads or deputies of departments who are not previous ordinaries), etc. They may also hold other positions such as cardinal. The see of titular bishop is only nominal, not pastoral- meaning he does not exercise final authority as the head bishop (the ordinary), or have the right to automatically succeed the aforementioned individual (the coadjutor), over an existing diocese or archdiocese or their Eastern rite equivalents, (arch-)eparchies. Titular bishops may be active or retired. Occasionally, as a priest, they may have been given a titular bishopric or archbishopric as an honor by the Pope, similar to when he names some cardinals.

Roman Catholic Church 

A diocesan bishop — in the Catholic Church — is entrusted with the pastoral care of a local Church (diocese), over which he holds ordinary jurisdiction.  He is responsible for teaching, governing, and sanctifying the faithful of his diocese, sharing these duties with the priests and deacons who serve under him.

Coadjutor bishop
The Holy See can appoint a coadjutor bishop for a diocese. He has special faculties and the right of succession.

Auxiliary bishop
The diocesan bishop may request that the Holy See appoint one or more auxiliary bishops to assist him in his duties.

Bishop emeritus
When a diocesan bishop or auxiliary bishop retires, the word "emeritus" is added to his former title, i.e., "Archbishop Emeritus of ...", "Bishop Emeritus of ...", or "Auxiliary Bishop Emeritus of ...".  Examples of usage are: "The Most Reverend (or Right Reverend) John Jones, Bishop Emeritus of Anytown"; and "His Eminence Cardinal James Smith, Archbishop Emeritus of Anycity". The term "Bishop Emeritus" of a particular see can apply to several people, if the first lives long enough. The sees listed in the 2007 Annuario Pontificio as having more than one bishop emeritus included Zárate-Campana, Villavicencio, Versailles, and Uruguaiana. There were even three Archbishops Emeriti of Taipei. The same suffix was applied to the Bishop of Rome, Pope Emeritus Benedict XVI, on his retirement.

See also 
 Ordinary (church officer)

Footnotes 

Bishops by type
 
Episcopacy in the Catholic Church